Confederation Centre of the Arts is a cultural centre dedicated to the visual and performing arts located in the city of Charlottetown, Prince Edward Island, Canada.

History
Construction of Confederation Centre, as it is commonly referred to, started in 1960 and Queen Elizabeth II officially opened it to the public on October 6, 1964.  The institution was originally built with funding by the ten provincial governments in Canada and the federal government as Canada's National Memorial to the Fathers of Confederation, who met in Charlottetown in September 1864 at what was called the Charlottetown Conference. Today its operations are 65% self-funded through ticket sales, memberships, donations, and sponsorships; 25% funded from Canadian Heritage; 6% funded from the Province of PEI; and 4% from other annual granting bodies.

The centre has played host to the Charlottetown Festival every summer since 1965, although there was no 2020 Charlottetown Festival due to the global COVID-19 pandemic. It holds the Guinness World Record for the longest running annual musical theatre production, Anne of Green Gables — The Musical, performed every summer from 1965 until 2019. Hundreds of other productions have been featured. The centre was designated a National Historic Sites of Canada in 2003.

In 2011 the mainstage Homburg Theatre underwent a $17-million renovation to improve acoustics, seating, lighting, and rigging. The project was completed in time for the centre's 50th anniversary in 2014.

Architecture
Confederation Centre was built on Queen's Square in the centre of Charlottetown's business district, immediately west of Province House, Prince Edward Island's legislature and the location of the Charlottetown Conference.  The centre is one contiguous structure, however at street level it appears as three separate buildings (hosting a theatre and art gallery) clustered around "Memorial Hall" which faces east toward Province House.  The Confederation Chambre in Province House, where the conference meetings took place, is located on the western side of that building, thus facing directly at Confederation Centre's Memorial Hall.

Confederation Centre covers a block in the central business district, bounded on three sides by Grafton Street, Queen Street, and Richmond Street. The structure houses an art museum, and several performing arts venues.

Art museum

Opened at the same time as the rest of the structure, the Confederation Centre Art Gallery is an art museum in the northeast pavilion of the Confederation Centre of the Arts. As of June 2017, it held over 17,000 works in its permanent collection.

Theatres
The Confederation Centre of the Arts includes a number of venues for the performing arts. These include a 1,109 seat mainstage theatre, the largest theatre mainstage in Canada east of Montreal; and two studio theatres.

References

Culture of Charlottetown
Buildings and structures in Charlottetown
Art museums and galleries in Prince Edward Island
Theatres in Prince Edward Island
Public libraries in Prince Edward Island
Arts centres in Canada
Brutalist architecture in Canada
National Historic Sites in Prince Edward Island
Music venues in Prince Edward Island
Performing arts centres in Canada
Arcop buildings
Government buildings completed in 1964